Iyannough (also Iyanough) was an American Indian sachem and leader of the Mattachiest (Mattakeese, a sub-group of the Wampanoag people) tribe of Cummaquid in the area of what is now Barnstable, Massachusetts. The village of Hyannis, the Wianno section of Osterville, and Iyanough Road (Route 132) are all named after him.

Life
Historic records mention the assistance and entertainment offered by him and his tribe towards the Pilgrims and later colonists. When the son of Mayflower passenger John Billington wandered away from the new settlement at Plymouth in January 1621, Iyannough assisted William Bradford and his party in finding the boy. The sachem impressed the Pilgrims as being personable, gentle, courteous, and fair-conditioned.

He died in 1623 when he was only in his mid-twenties. Following a surprise attack by the Pilgrims on the Massachusett tribe that winter, many Indians in the region including Iyannough grew fearful of the colonists and fled to hide in the area's swamps and remote islands. It is believed that Iyannough himself died of exposure during this time. Upon his early death, his lands went to his eldest son Yanno  (aka John Hyanno).

Legacy
Yanno is mentioned in several land deeds on Cape Cod and Martha's Vineyard and appears to have been a prominent figure in the early settlement of the communities.

In the 20th century, Charles Libby was plowing his field and discovered what is believed to be Iyannough's grave. He discovered an underground tomb with baskets befitting a chief and upon contacting the historical society all contents were removed and a modern cement marker was placed at the site. He was told that public access to the site had to be maintained and a marker on 6A marks where a public trail should begin. Public access was maintained while Mr. Libby owned the property but is no longer accessible.  The gravesite is just north of Route 6A in the Cummaquid section of Barnstable and is maintained by a non-profit organization called "Tales of Cape Cod." A sign along Route 6A marks the spot.

A statue of Iyannough can be found today on the village green in downtown Hyannis.

See also
 Hyannis
 Nauset

References

External links
 Notes on Iyannough at Genealogy.com
 Picture of his gravesite in Cummaquid

Year of birth missing
1623 deaths
Native American leaders
Native American people of the Indian Wars
17th-century Native Americans
Wampanoag people
Native American people from Massachusetts